Ida is an unincorporated community in Cleburne County, Arkansas, United States. Ida has a post office with ZIP code 72546., Ida also hosts a hair-salon and convenience store

References

Unincorporated communities in Cleburne County, Arkansas
Unincorporated communities in Arkansas